Olkhovatka is a rural locality (a village) in Sklyayevskoye Rural Settlement, Ramonsky District, Voronezh Oblast, Russia. The population was 91 as of 2010. There are 4 streets.

Geography 
Olkhovatka is located near the Olkhovatoye Lake, 23 km west of Ramon (the district's administrative centre) by road. Gnezdilovo is the nearest rural locality.

References 

Rural localities in Ramonsky District